Neogobius bathybius is a species of goby endemic to the Caspian Sea, where it occurs in depths down to . It is strictly confined to the brackish-water basin and does not enter fresh waters. It can grow up to a length of  TL.

The species was transferred to the genus Ponticola from Neogobius on the basis of relationship revealed in molecular investigations. On the other hand, recent molecular studies have proven that this species belongs entirely to the genus Neogobius.

References

Neogobius
Fish of the Caspian Sea
Fish of Western Asia
Taxa named by Karl Kessler
Fish described in 1877
Endemic fauna of the Caspian Sea